The Chief Son-I-Hat's Whale House and Totems Historic District, also known as the New Kasaan Totem Pole Park, is a historic district encompassing the relocated remnants of Old Kasaan, a historic village of the Haida people in Prince of Wales–Hyder Census Area, Alaska.  Now located in new Kasaan, the property includes the c. 1880 clan house of Chief Son-I-Hat, the Haida leader who oversaw the relocation of the people from Old to New Kasaan, and a totem pole he moved.  In the 1930s, crews from the Civilian Conservation Corps relocated and/or replicated additional totem poles at the house site, restored the house, constructed a small park, and cut a trail from the center of new Kasaan to the park and adjacent cemeteries.

The site was listed on the National Register of Historic Places in 2002.

See also
National Register of Historic Places listings in Prince of Wales–Hyder Census Area, Alaska

References

External links 
Chief Son-I-Hat's Whale House and Totems Historic District at The Living New Deal Project

Buildings and structures completed in 1904
Historic districts on the National Register of Historic Places in Alaska
National Register of Historic Places in Prince of Wales–Hyder Census Area, Alaska
Native American history of Alaska